The Ordinance of Nullification declared the Tariffs of 1828 and 1832 null and void within the borders of the U.S. state of South Carolina, beginning on February 1, 1833. It began the Nullification Crisis. Passed by a state convention on November 24, 1832, it led to President Andrew Jackson's proclamation against South Carolina, the Nullification Proclamation on December 10, 1832, which threatened to send government ground troops to enforce the tariffs. In the face of the military threat, and following a Congressional revision of the law which lowered the tariff, South Carolina repealed the ordinance.

The protest that led to the Ordinance of Nullification was caused by the belief that the tariffs of 1828 and 1832 favored the North over the South and therefore violated the Constitution. This led to an emphasis on the differences between the two regions and helped set the stage for conflict during the antebellum era, eventually leading to the American Civil War.

References

External links

Transcript of Ordinance of Nullification from The Federalist: A Commentary on the Constitution of the United States; edited by Paul Leicester Ford; 1898; Appendix pp. 690
President Jackson's Message to the Senate and House Regarding South Carolina's Nullification Ordinance; January 16, 1833
President Jackson's Nullification Proclamation (1832)

Legal history of South Carolina
South Carolina law
Nullification crisis
1832 in American law
1832 in South Carolina